The 1978 United States Senate election in Rhode Island took place on November 7, 1978. Incumbent Democratic U.S. Senator Claiborne Pell successfully sought re-election, defeating Republican James G. Reynolds.

Democratic primary

Candidates 
 Claiborne Pell, incumbent U.S. Senator
 Raymond J. Greiner
 Francis P. Kelley

Results

Republican primary

Candidates 
 James G. Reynolds

General election

Results

See also 
 1978 United States Senate elections

References 

Rhode Island
1978
1978 Rhode Island elections